Emory Riddling "Hoss" Hodgson (March 5, 1886 – December 22, 1967) was an American football player and coach. He was a prominent guard and punter for the VPI Gobblers. Hodgson scored in the near upset of Princeton in 1909.

References

1886 births
1967 deaths
Players of American football from Washington, D.C.
All-Southern college football players
American football guards
American football punters
Virginia Tech Hokies football players
Georgetown Hoyas football players